The 1983 Tulsa Roughnecks season was the club's sixth season of existence, and their fifth in North American Soccer League, the top flight of American soccer at that time. The 1983 season was Terry Hennessey's second full NASL season as head coach of the Roughnecks.

On October 1, 1983, Tulsa defeated Toronto 2–0 in Soccer Bowl '83 in Vancouver, becoming  first and only professional franchise to win a sports championship title in the state of Oklahoma.

Club

Roster

Management and technical staff
 Carl Moore – Co-Owner
 Mike Kimbrel – Co-Owner
 Rick Lowenherz – Co-Owner
 Fred Williams – Co-Owner
 Alex Skotarek – General Manager
 Jim Boeh – Communications Director
 Terry Hennessey – Head Coach 
 Steve Earle – Assistant Coach
 Larry Egge – Trainer

Honors
The Roughnecks received two individual honors following the 1983 NASL season. 
 Soccer Bowl Man of the Match: Njego Pesa
 NASL All-Star, First Team: Barry Wallace

Review

Competitions

Friendlies

NASL regular season

Overview

Division standings
W = Wins, L = Losses, GF = Goals For, GA = Goals Against, GD = Goal differential, PTS= point system

6 points for a win in regulation and overtime, 4 point for a shootout win,
0 points for a loss,
1 bonus point for each regulation goal scored, up to three per game.
 - Qualified for NASL playoffs.

Overall league playoff seeding
Division champions automatically receive top three seeds
 - Division champions

Results by round

Match reports

NASL Playoffs

Playoff bracket

Quarter-finals

Semi-finals

Final

Statistics

Season scoring
GP = Games Played, G = Goals (worth 2 points), A = Assists (worth 1 point), Pts = Points

Season goalkeeping
Note: GP = Games played; Min = Minutes played; Svs = Saves; GA = Goals against; GAA = Goals against average; W = Wins; L = Losses; SO = Shut outs

Playoff scoring
G = Goals (worth 2 points), A = Assists (worth 1 point), Pts = Points

Playoff goalkeeping
Note: GP = Games played; Min = Minutes played; Svs = Saves; GA = Goals against; GAA = Goals against average; W = Wins; L = Losses; SO = Shut outs

Player movement

References

1983 North American Soccer League season
1983 in American soccer leagues
1983
American soccer clubs 1983 season
1983 in sports in Oklahoma